Jack Brennan (born as Gottlieb Doering) was an American professional baseball catcher in the late 19th century. In his five-year career he played with the St. Louis Maroons, Kansas City Cowboys of the American Association, Philadelphia Athletics of the AA, and the Cleveland Infants.

Brennan was born Gottlieb Doering in St. Louis, Missouri in 1862.

References

Sources

Cleveland Infants players
St. Louis Maroons players
Kansas City Cowboys players
Philadelphia Athletics players
Major League Baseball catchers
19th-century baseball players
Baseball players from St. Louis
Memphis Reds players
New Orleans Pelicans (baseball) players
Memphis Browns players
Eau Claire (minor league baseball) players
St. Joseph Reds players
Birmingham Maroons players
Denver Mountaineers players
Grand Rapids Shamrocks players
Spokane Bunchgrassers players
Butte (minor league baseball) players
Petersburg Farmers players
Austin Beavers players
1862 births
1914 deaths